Waterman Creek is a  southward-flowing stream in southern San Mateo County, California. Rising near Big Basin Way and the Santa Cruz County line, it empties into Pescadero Creek.

References

See also
List of watercourses in the San Francisco Bay Area

Rivers of San Mateo County, California
Rivers of Santa Cruz County, California
Rivers of Northern California
Tributaries of Pescadero Creek